Petr Lisičan (5 June 1962 – 22 April 2012) was a Czech cross-country skier. He competed in the men's 30 kilometre classical event at the 1988 Winter Olympics.

References

External links
 

1962 births
2012 deaths
Czech male cross-country skiers
Olympic cross-country skiers of Czechoslovakia
Cross-country skiers at the 1988 Winter Olympics
People from Polička
Sportspeople from the Pardubice Region